The Return is the eighth studio album by American rock band Nonpoint. It was released on September 30, 2014 in the United States via Razor & Tie and worldwide via Metal Blade Records. "Breaking Skin", the first single from the album, was released on August 12, 2014.

The album entered the Billboard 200 charts at No. 38, making it their highest charting album to date with approximately 8,125 copies sold during its first week of release.  It has sold 27,000 copies in the United States as of June 2016.

Track listing

Personnel 
The band's new album titled The Return was released on September 30, 2014. Also Nonpoint released the song "Breaking Skin" as the album's lead single on August 12, 2014. BC Kochmit (Eye Empire, Switched) took over Nonpoint's lead guitar duties following the removal of Dave Lizzio.[10]
Members
Elias Soriano – lead vocals
Robb "El Martillo" Rivera - drums
Rasheed Thomas - rhythm guitar, backing vocals
Adam Woloszyn - bass
Dave Lizzio – lead guitar

Production
Produced by Daniel Salcido & Nonpoint
Engineered & mixed by Johnny K, at Groovemaster Studios, Chicago, Illinois 
Mastered by Brad Blackwood
Management by Steve Davis (Davis Entertainment Group)

Chart performance

References 

2014 albums
Nonpoint albums
Razor & Tie albums
Metal Blade Records albums